is a Japanese sport shooter who competed in the 2004 Summer Olympics.

References

1968 births
Living people
Japanese male sport shooters
ISSF pistol shooters
Olympic shooters of Japan
Shooters at the 2004 Summer Olympics
Shooters at the 2002 Asian Games
Asian Games competitors for Japan
21st-century Japanese people